"Better in Blak" is a song by Australian singer/songwriter Thelma Plum, released on 26 April 2019 as the third single from her debut studio album of the same name.

In July 2019, "Better in Blak" was nominated for Film Clip of the Year at the National Indigenous Music Awards.

At the ARIA Music Awards of 2019, "Better in Blak" was nominated for Best Video.

At the J Awards of 2019, the song was nominated for Australian Video of the Year.

At the APRA Music Awards of 2020, "Better in Blak" was nominated for Song of the Year.

The song won the 2020 Vanda & Young Global Songwriting Competition.

Background
Upon release, Plum said: "I wrote 'Better in Blak' about my experiences with people trying to take the colour from the conversation. My colour is an important part of who I am, and over the last couple of years I've had people try and tell me 'it's not about colour' when obviously to me it is."

Reception
Laura English from Music Feeds wrote: "The track is all about the frustrating experiences Plum faces as a Gamilaraay woman and musician", describing it as "an emotional, cathartic song that sees honest lyrics coupled with upbeat, danceable beats".

Music video
The music video was directed by Claudia Sangiorgi Dalimore and released on 28 May 2019. It was nominated for Best Video at the ARIA Music Awards of 2019.

Track listing

Charts

Certifications

References

2019 singles
2019 songs
Thelma Plum songs
Songs written by Alexander Burnett (musician)
Vanda & Young Global Songwriting Competition Winning Songs